The nominal fallacy, also known as the naming-explaining fallacy, is a logical fallacy in which it is incorrectly assumed that giving something a name is tantamount to explaining it. Stuart Firestein has described the fallacy as "...the error of believing that the label carries explanatory information." One example of the nominal fallacy is the use of the word "instinct" to explain a given behavior.
Basically, asserting that "x" has a certain property just because of its name is another example of Nominal fallacy.

References

Fallacies